The Ludwigsburger Kreiszeitung (LNC) is a German-language daily newspaper printed and distributed in the district of Ludwigsburg.

History
The Ludwigsburger Kreiszeitung began its publication on 1 July 1818 as the Ludwigsburger Wochenblatt.

Circulation
, the Ludwigsburger Kreiszeitungs circulation is 33,706.

Citations

German-language newspapers
Publications established in 1818